Fast and Loose is a cheating game played at fairs by sharpers. It is also known as Pricking the Garter (Renaissance), The Strap (1930 con man argot), The Old Army Game (World War II), The Australian Belt, and Pricking at the Belt.

The basic game is played with a circle of some sort of material, typically belts or garters in the past, or loops of string or jewellery chains in modern times. It is placed on a table in such a way that it forms two open loops. The player, or mark, places their finger or stick in one of the loops.

If they choose the right one, when the sharper attempts to lift the chain it will wrap around the object and become "fast" and the player wins. If they choose the wrong one, it is not actually around the object and is "loose". The confidence game involves the fact that which loop is fast changes depending on the way it is lifted, so the sharper can always make it loose.

The term "playing fast and loose" now means to be tricky, saying one thing and doing another. This use of the term has been traced back to William Shakespeare's King John, implying the trick was already well established in the 16th century.

History
In older periods, the leather or cloth webbing garters that men used to hold their stockings up around their thighs were used in this game; later, the cloth webbing belts like those used by soldiers were popular. Whatever the form, the game is played the same. A strap, usually in the form of a belt, is folded in half by the street hustler or mountebank, and then wound into a coil, forming two identical loops in the center of the coil—one the folded center of the strap, and the other its first fold. These loops look identical.

The scam artist challenges a spectator to place a stick in the true center loop — the one that holds Fast to the stick when the two ends of the strap are pulled. If the operator pulled and the strap came "loose," the spectator lost his bet. Since the operator could secretly change how the two ends are pulled away, he could always win. Shills would help encourage others to play, make it look possible to win, and give "advice" to the "marks" who tried to win. By winning, the shills encourage others to try — "It's easy, if you know how to spot it." At one time a popular scam, it was much practised by Gypsies, a circumstance alluded to by Shakespeare in Antony and Cleopatra (iv. 12):

"Like a right gipsy, hath, at fast and loose, Beguiled me to the very heart of loss."

Shakespeare also mentions Fast and Loose  in "Love's Labour's Lost". This phrase is often attributed to Shakespeare, but according to the OED, first appears as the title of an epigram in a popular miscellany from 1557. An act of the Parliament of Scotland from March 1575 set fines of up to five pounds Scots for those "using subtile, crafty and unlauchfull playis, as juglerie [i.e. magic] fast and lowise, and sic utheris". The colloquial expression to "play fast and loose" — to act or live recklessly or thoughtlessly — has come into our common usage from Shakespeare. Sometime in the 18th or 19th century, the scam was resurrected with a new method — one which used a continuous loop of string.

The scam artists who worked the docks would often play this con on a barrel top for the sailors. This new version of the game was called "On the Barrelhead," from the phrase, "Put your money on the Barrelhead." It was also known as "The Figure Eight" and later as "The Endless Chain."

Two or more loops are formed within the circle of a string (see figure below). The spectator bets on which loop will hold Fast. In this version, it doesn’t matter in what manner the string is picked up. Instead, the important thing is the method used to lay it out. Laid out in one pattern, one of the loops holds "fast." Laid out in what looked like an identical pattern, none of the loops would hold "fast" — the victims cannot win. Since both the belt style games and the endless string and loop games are so similar, Fast and Loose is often used as a general term for this kind of game.

How it works

Pricking the Garter

On the Barrelhead

The loop is laid out in a twist so that it forms a circle with an X in it, similar to a Cat's cradle or infinity symbol.  The mark picks one side of the X or the other as the side to which the loop will hold fast when pulled from the other side.  Unfortunately for the mark, the loop can be laid out in multiple ways.  Here are a few versions that demonstrate the con:

1) The basic loop: Take a loop of string and lay it on the table.  Take the right hand side of the loop and bring it down and around (clockwise) until it overlaps the other end of the loop.  Do not twist the loop at all.  The right hand side of the X is the gab around which you formed the circle-X and is thus the loose-side.  The overlapped part is trapped and is the hold-side.

2) The cheat loop: Take a loop of string and lay it on the table.  Take the right hand side of the loop and twist it 180 degrees counter-clockwise.  Then bring it down and around (clockwise) as before.  Again the gap on the right hand side is loose, but now the overlapped portion on the left hand side is also loose.  Additionally, by picking up the bottom string and pulling it through the top string on either side will cause the loop to wrap around the opposite side and hold fast.  Thus both sides will hold fast or come loose at the con-artists discretion.

References

Haydn, Whit, "School for Scoundrels Notes on Fast and Loose." School for Scoundrels, Canyon Lake, CA, 2000.

Games of physical skill